José Luis DeJesús (born January 6, 1965) is an American former professional baseball right-handed starting pitcher. He played in Major League Baseball (MLB) from 1988 to 1994, with the Kansas City Royals and Philadelphia Phillies. DeJesús batted right-handed.

In 1988 and 1989, DeJesús played in only five games for the Kansas City Royals, with an 0–1 record. He played 1990 and 1991 with the Philadelphia Phillies, where he went 7–8 and 10–9, respectively. After a sitting out the 1992 season with injuries, DeJesús rehabbed in the Phillies’ farm system, in 1993. In 1994, he returned to the Royals, posting a 3–1 record. DeJesús continued his career in the Royals’  and New York Yankees’ minor league organizations, briefly retiring after the 1996 campaign. In 1998 and 1999, he played in the Independent Leagues.

DeJesús was born in Brooklyn, New York, and now resides in Cidra, Puerto Rico.

References

External links

1965 births
Living people
Sportspeople from Brooklyn
Baseball players from New York City
Major League Baseball pitchers
Kansas City Royals players
Philadelphia Phillies players
Atlantic City Surf players
Newark Bears players
Albany-Colonie Diamond Dogs players
Clearwater Phillies players
Columbus Clippers players
Fort Myers Royals players
Memphis Chicks players
Mercuries Tigers players
Omaha Royals players
Scranton/Wilkes-Barre Red Barons players
American expatriate baseball players in Taiwan